Deanna "D. J." Conway (May 3, 1939 – February 1, 2019) was a non-fiction author of books in the field of magic, Wicca, Druidism, shamanism, metaphysics and the occult, and the author of three fantasy novels. Born in Hood River, Oregon to a family of Irish, North Germanic, and Native North American descent, she studied the occult and Pagan religion for over thirty years. In 1998 she was voted Best Wiccan and New Age author by Silver Chalice, a Neo-Pagan magazine. She was an ordained minister in two New Age churches and holder of a Doctor of Divinity degree. Several of her stories were published in magazines, such as the science fantasy publication Encounters, and she was interviewed in magazines and appeared on such television shows as Journey with Brenda Roberts. She also designed Tarot decks, in collaboration with fellow author Sirona Knight and illustrator Lisa Hunt.

Bibliography

Non-fiction
 Advanced Celtic Shamanism (2000) Crossing Press , 
 The Ancient and Shining Ones (1995) Llewellyn Publications , 
 The Ancient Art of Faery Magick (2005) Crossing Press , 
 Animal Magick: The Art of Recognizing and Working with Familiars (1995) Llewellyn Worldwide Ltd , 
 Astral Love: Romance, Ecstasy & Higher Consciousness (Llewellyn's Tantra & Sexual Arts Series) (1995) Llewellyn Publications , 
 By Oak, Ash & Thorn: Modern Celtic Shamanism (2002) Llewellyn Publications , 
 The Celtic Book of Names: Traditional Names From Ireland, Scotland and Wales (2000) Citadel , 
 The Celtic Dragon Tarot (1999) Llewellyn Publications , 
 Celtic Magic (1990) Llewellyn Worldwide Ltd , 
 Crystal Enchantments: A Complete Guide to Stones (1999) Crossing Press , 
 Dancing with Dragons: Invoke Their Ageless Wisdom and Power (1994) Llewellyn Publications , 
 Elemental Magick: Meditations, Exercises, Spells And Rituals to Help You Connect With Nature (2005) New Page Books , 
 Falcon Feather, Valkyrie Sword (1996) Llewellyn Publications , 
 The Fantastical Creatures Tarot (2007) U.S. Games Systems , 
 Feminine Shamanism, Witchcraft and Magick: Invoking Woman's Power with Kimberly Nightingale (2000) Llewellyn ,  (2000)
 Flying Without a Broom: Astral Projection & the Astral World (2002) Llewellyn Publications , 
 Guides, Guardians and Angels (2009) Llewellyn 
 Laying On Of Stones (1999) Crossing Press , 
 A Little Book of Altar Magic (2001) Crossing Press , 
 A Little Book of Candle Magic (2000) Crossing Press , 
 A Little Book of Healing Magic (2002) Crossing Press , 
 The Little Book of Pendulum Magic (2000) Crossing Press , 
 Lord of Light and Shadow: The Many Faces of the God (1997) Llewellyn Publications , 
 Magick of the Gods and Goddesses: How to Invoke Their Powers (1997) Llewellyn Publications , 
 Magickal Mermaids and Water Creatures (2004) New Page Books , 
 Magickal Mystical Creatures: Invite Their Powers Into Your Life (2001) Llewellyn Publications , 
 Magickal, Mythical, Mystical Beasts: How to Invite Them Into Your Life (1996) Llewellyn Publications , 
 Maiden, Mother, Crone: The Myth & Reality of the Triple Goddess (1995) Llewellyn Publications , 
 Moon Magick: Myth & Magic, Crafts & Recipes, Rituals & Spells (2002) Llewellyn Publications , 
 The Mysterious, Magickal Cat: The Magick of Claw & Whisker (1998) Llewellyn Publications , 
 Mystical Dragon Magic: Teachings of the Five Inner Rings (2007) Llewellyn Publications , 
 Norse Magick (1990) Llewellyn Publications , 
 Perfect Love: Finding Intimacy on the Astral Plane (1998) Llewellyn Publications , 
 Wicca: The Complete Craft (2001) Crossing Press , 
Standing on the Edge (true story of NDE with her husband) (2013) ebook or print on demand on Amazon.

Fiction
 The Dream Warrior (Book I of the Dream Warrior Trilogy) (1997) Llewellyn Publications , 
 Soothslayer: A Magical Fantasy (Book II of the Dream Warrior Trilogy) (1997) Llewellyn Publications , 
 Warrior of Shadows: The Final Battle (Book III of The Dream Warrior Trilogy) (2002) Llewellyn Publications , 
The Broken Spell (2013) print on demand or ebook from Amazon.

Tarot Decks
 Celtic Dragon Tarot - D.J. Conway & Lisa Hunt: Llewellyn Publications (October 1, 1999)
 Shapeshifter Tarot - D.J. Conway, Sirona Knight & Lisa Hunt: Llewellyn Publications (September 1, 2002) , 
Mystical Creatures Tarot with Lisa Hunt; U. S. Games.

Notes

External links
 Official website
 Aeclectic Tarot Website: Interview by Darryn Varey

1939 births
2019 deaths
American fantasy writers
American occult writers
People from Hood River, Oregon
American male novelists
American Wiccans
Wiccan writers
Wiccan novelists